Sean Smith may refer to:

Sean Smith (defensive end) (born 1967), former American football player for the New England Patriots
Sean Smith (skier) (born 1971), American Olympic skier
Sean Smith (diplomat) (1978–2012), who died in the 2012 attack on the U.S. consulate in Benghazi
Sean Smith (cornerback) (born 1987), American football cornerback
Sean Smith (chemist), academic and director of NCI Australia
Sean Smith (photojournalist), British photographer and filmmaker
Sean Smith (English singer), (born 1985), member of British pop duo Same Difference
Sean Smith (Welsh singer), member of Welsh band The Blackout
Sean Smith, alias for voice actor Sean Schemmel
Sean Smith (Brookside), a character from the British television series Brookside

See also
Shaun Smith (disambiguation)
Shawn Smith (disambiguation)
Seán Smyth, Irish fiddler